Angelo Jayasinghe (born 25 January 1993) is a Sri Lankan first-class cricketer who plays for Colts Cricket Club. In November 2021, he was selected to play for the Galle Gladiators following the players' draft for the 2021 Lanka Premier League.

References

External links
 

1993 births
Living people
Sri Lankan cricketers
Chilaw Marians Cricket Club cricketers
Colts Cricket Club cricketers
Place of birth missing (living people)
Hambantota Troopers cricketers
Kegalle District cricketers